Botswana national basketball team is the national basketball team of Botswana. It is governed by the Botswana Basketball Association (BBA).

Botswana had its last noteworthy appearance at the AfroBasket 2015 qualification where, after a long battle, it ceded to Mozambique 68–69.

Current roster
Team for the 2015 Afrobasket Qualification:

Competitive record

AfroBasket
Botswana has never qualified for a AfroBasket main tournament, however, it has appeared in several qualification rounds.

See also
 Botswana national under-19 basketball team
 Botswana national under-17 basketball team
 Botswana national 3x3 team
 Botswana women's national basketball team

References

External links
 Botswana Basketball Association
 Botswana Basketball Records at FIBA Archive
 Botswana Basketball Twitter Account

 
1997 establishments in Botswana
 
Men's national basketball teams